Edwina Brown (born July 1, 1978) is an American former professional basketball player.

Professional career
Brown was part of a three-way tie for second place in the 2000 WNBA Rookie of the Year voting. She played 130 games in the WNBA. She also played professionally in other countries: Lebanon, Austria, Spain, France and Israel.

USA Basketball
Brown won a gold medal with Team USA at the 1998 R. Williams Jones Cup and a bronze medal at the 1999 Pan American Games.

Personal life
Aside from basketball, Brown has worked with organizations that give back to their communities. She is the founder of MAP’D Out (Mentoring Athletes and Providing Dreams).

Texas statistics
Source

Career statistics

Regular season

|-
| style="text-align:left;"|2000
| style="text-align:left;"|Detroit
| 32 || 7 || 19.3 || .357 || .250 || .838 || 2.8 || 2.3 || 0.8 || 0.2 || 2.1 || 5.9
|-
| style="text-align:left;"|2001
| style="text-align:left;"|Detroit
| 32 || 14 || 25.0 || .366 || .377 || .783 || 3.2 || 2.7 || 1.0 || 0.2 || 2.1 || 7.4
|-
| style="text-align:left;"|2002
| style="text-align:left;"|Detroit
| 28 || 7 || 19.6 || .328 || .500 || .719 || 2.9 || 2.1 || 0.9 || 0.3 || 2.1 || 4.1
|-
| style="text-align:left;"|2003
| style="text-align:left;"|Phoenix
| 34 || 6 || 15.4 || .270 || .000 || .818 || 2.1 || 1.8 || 0.9 || 0.2 || 1.4 || 3.5
|-
| style="text-align:left;"|2006
| style="text-align:left;"|Houston
| 4 || 0 || 7.0 || .200 || .000 || 1.000 || 1.0 || 0.3 || 0.3 || 0.0 || 0.5 || 1.0
|-
| style="text-align:left;"|Career
| style="text-align:left;"|5 years, 3 teams
| 130 || 34 || 19.4 || .334 || .375 || .803 || 2.7 || 2.2 || 0.9 || 0.2 || 1.9 || 5.1

See also
2014–15 TCU Lady Frogs basketball team

References

External links
List of USA R. Williams Jones Cup Team participants
TCU coaching bio
Texas bio
Edwina Brown Official website

1978 births
Living people
All-American college women's basketball players
American women's basketball coaches
American women's basketball players
Basketball players at the 1999 Pan American Games
Basketball players from Dallas
Detroit Shock players
Forwards (basketball)
Guards (basketball)
Houston Comets players
Pan American Games bronze medalists for the United States
Pan American Games medalists in basketball
Phoenix Mercury players
Sportspeople from Dallas
TCU Horned Frogs women's basketball coaches
Texas Longhorns women's basketball players
Medalists at the 1999 Pan American Games
United States women's national basketball team players